Ramón Sota Ocejo (23 April 1938 – 28 August 2012) was a Spanish professional golfer.

Sota was born in Pedreña, Cantabria. He won many professional tournaments around the world including some of the major national opens around Europe that formed the basis of the European Tour when it was formed in 1972. Those wins included his own national open, three Portuguese Opens and the French Open. He recorded several victories farther afield, including winning the Brazil Open in 1965. He was also Spanish professional champion four times.

In 1965, Sota finished 6th at the U.S. Masters, which at the time was the best performance in the tournament by any European. He finished 10th on the European Order of Merit in 1971, the year prior to the official start of the new European Tour. He only competed on the tour for one season, in 1972. During that season's Double Diamond International he became the first player ever to be penalised for slow play in Britain. The humiliation he felt following the incident led him to retire shortly afterwards, although he did return to play on the European Seniors Tour for a few years in the mid 1990s.

Sota started the Club de Golf Ramon Sota in Marina de Cudeyo, which has a 9-hole par–3 course and a golf school. He was also the uncle of Spain's most successful golfer, Seve Ballesteros.

Sota died in August 2012 of pneumonia.

Tournament wins
This list may be incomplete
1956 Spanish Professional Championship
1959 Spanish Professional Championship
1960 Spanish Professional Championship
1961 Spanish Professional Championship
1963 Spanish Open, Portuguese Open
1965 French Open, Brazil Open
1966 Dutch Open, Puerto Rico Open
1969 Portuguese Open, Madrid Open
1970 Portuguese Open
1971 Algarve Open, Italian Open, Dutch Open

Results in major championships

Note: Sota only played in the Masters Tournament and The Open Championship.

CUT = missed the half-way cut
"T" indicates a tie for a place

Team appearances
World Cup (representing Spain): 1961, 1963, 1964, 1965, 1967, 1968, 1969, 1970, 1971
Joy Cup (representing the Rest of Europe): 1958
Double Diamond International (representing Continental Europe): 1972 (captain)

References

External links

Spanish male golfers
European Tour golfers
European Senior Tour golfers
Golfers from Cantabria
1938 births
2012 deaths